Lady Dalrymple may refer to:

People
 Viscountess of Dalrymple, see Viscount of Dalrymple
 Consort to one of the Dalrymple baronets
 Gentlewomen and aristocrats with the surname Dalrymple (name)

Fictional characters
 Lady Dalrymple, a character from the 1817 Jane Austen novel Persuasion (novel)

See also
 Dalrymple (disambiguation)